Hamperden End is a hamlet located to the east of the village of Widdington, in the Uttlesford district, in the county of Essex, England. Another nearby village is Debden Green. Hamperden End has a Caravan Site.

Location grid

References

External links 

Hamlets in Essex
Uttlesford